The second inauguration of Lyndon B. Johnson as president of the United States was held on Wednesday, January 20, 1965, at the East Portico of the United States Capitol in Washington, D.C. This was the 45th inauguration and marked the second and only full term of Lyndon B. Johnson as president and the only term of Hubert Humphrey as vice president. Chief Justice Earl Warren administered the oath of office. Lady Bird Johnson founded the tradition of incoming first ladies participating in the ceremony by holding the sworn-in president's Bible. Vice President Humphrey was sworn-in by John W. McCormack, the speaker of the House of Representatives. This was the first inauguration when the president rode in a bulletproof limousine.

An estimated 1.2 million attended the inauguration, the third largest crowd for any event ever held at the National Mall, behind the inaugurations of Truman in 1949 and Obama in 2009. This was the last time an inauguration was covered by newsreels.

Inauguration gala 
On January 18 in Washington, D.C. a pre-inauguration gala was arranged by the Democratic National Committee and The President's Club to honor the incoming President. Many stars and celebrities participated in the gala including Alfred Hitchcock, Nichols and May, Woody Allen, Ann-Margret, and singers Bobby Darrin, Barbra Streisand, Carol Channing, Harry Belafonte, Julie Andrews, and Carol Burnett.

See also
Presidency of Lyndon B. Johnson
First inauguration of Lyndon B. Johnson
1964 United States presidential election

References

External links
  (1965)
 (with audio)

 Text of Johnson's Inaugural Address
 Audio of Johnson's Inaugural Address

1965 in American politics
Inauguration 1965
United States presidential inaugurations
1965 in Washington, D.C.
January 1965 events in the United States